The Athlon 64 X2 is the first native dual-core desktop central processing unit (CPU) designed by Advanced Micro Devices (AMD). It was designed from scratch as native dual-core by using an already multi-CPU enabled Athlon 64, joining it with another functional core on one die, and connecting both via a shared dual-channel memory controller/north bridge and additional control logic. The initial versions are based on the E stepping model of the Athlon 64 and, depending on the model, have either 512 or 1024 KB of L2 cache per core. The Athlon 64 X2 can decode instructions for Streaming SIMD Extensions 3 (SSE3), except those few specific to Intel's architecture. The first Athlon 64 X2 CPUs were released in May 2005, in the same month as Intel's first dual-core processor, the Pentium D.

In June 2007, AMD released low-voltage variants of their low-end 65 nm Athlon 64 X2, named "Athlon X2". The Athlon X2 processors feature reduced thermal design power (TDP) of 45 Watt (W). The name was also used for K10 based budget CPUs with two cores deactivated.

Multithreading

The primary benefit of dual-core processors (like the Athlon 64 X2) over single-core processors is their ability to process more software threads at the same time. The ability of processors to execute multiple threads simultaneously is called thread-level parallelism (TLP). By placing two cores on the same die, the X2 effectively doubles the TLP over a single-core Athlon 64 of the same speed. The need for TLP processing ability depends on the situation to a great degree, and some situations benefit from it far more than others. Some programs are currently written for only one thread, and thus cannot use the processing power of a second core.

Programs often written with multiple threads and able to use dual-cores include many music and video encoding applications, and especially professional rendering programs. High TLP applications currently correspond to server and workstation situations more than the typical desktop. These applications can reach almost twice the performance of a single-core Athlon 64 of the same specifications. Multitasking also runs a sizable number of threads. Intense multitasking processes have sped up by considerably more than twice. This is mostly due to the high overhead caused by constantly switching threads, and could potentially be improved by adjustments to operating system scheduling code.

In the consumer segment of the market, the X2 improves on the performance of the original Athlon 64, especially for multi-threaded software.

Manufacturing costs
Having two cores, the Athlon 64 X2 has an increased number of transistors. The 1 MB L2 cache 90 nm Athlon 64 X2 processor is 219 mm² in size with 243 million transistors  whereas its 1 MB L2 cache 90 nm Athlon 64 counterpart is 103.1 mm² and has 164 million transistors. The 65 nm Athlon 64 X2 with only 512 KB L2 per Core reduced this to 118 mm² with 221 million transistors compared to the 65 nm Athlon 64 with 77.2 mm² and 122 million transistors. As a result, a larger area of silicon must be defect free. These size requirements necessitate a more complex fabrication process, which further adds to the production of fewer functional processors per single silicon wafer. This lower yield makes the X2 more expensive to produce than the single-core processor.

In the middle of June 2006 AMD stated that they would no longer make any non-FX Athlon 64 or Athlon 64 X2 models with 1 MB L2 caches. This led to only a small production number of the Socket-AM2 Athlon 64 X2 with 1 MB L2 cache per core, known as 4000+, 4400+, 4800+, and 5200+. The Athlon 64 X2 with 512 KB per core, known as 3800+, 4200+, 4600+, and 5000+, were produced in far greater numbers. The introduction of the F3 stepping then saw several models with 1 MB L2 cache per core as production refinements resulted in an increased yield.

Features

CPU cores

Athlon 64 X2

Manchester (90 nm SOI)
 Silicon on insulator (SOI)
 CPU stepping: E4
 L1 cache: 64 + 64 KB (data + instructions), per core
 L2 cache: 256, 512 KB full speed, per core
 MMX, Extended 3DNow!, SSE, SSE2, SSE3, AMD64, Cool'n'Quiet, NX Bit
 Socket 939, HyperTransport (1000 MHz, HT1000)
 VCore: 1.35–1.4 V
 Power use (TDP): 89 Watt
 First release: 1 August 2005
 Clock rate: 2000–2400 MHz
 256 KB L2 cache:
 3600+: 2000 MHz
 512 KB L2 cache:
 3800+: 2000 MHz
 4200+: 2200 MHz
 4600+: 2400 MHz (110 Watt TDP)

Toledo (90 nm SOI)
 Silicon on insulator (SOI)
 CPU stepping: E6
 L1 cache: 64 + 64 KB (data + instructions), per core
 L2 cache: 512 or 1024 KB full speed, per core
 MMX, Extended 3DNow!, SSE, SSE2, SSE3, AMD64, Cool'n'Quiet, NX Bit
 Socket 939, HyperTransport (1000 MHz, HT1000)
 VCore: 1.35–1.4 V
 Power use (TDP):
 89 Watt: 3800+, 4200+ and 4400+
 110 Watt: 4400+, 4600+ and 4800+
 First release: 21 April 2005
 Clock rate: 2000–2400 MHz
 512 KB L2 cache:
 3800+: 2000 MHz
 4200+: 2200 MHz
 4600+: 2400 MHz
 1024 KB L2 cache:
 4400+: 2200 MHz
 4800+: 2400 MHz

Windsor (90 nm SOI)

 Silicon on insulator (SOI)
 CPU stepping: F2, F3
 L1 cache: 64 + 64 KB (data + instructions), per core
 L2 cache: 256, 512 or 1024 KB full speed, per core
 MMX, Extended 3DNow!, SSE, SSE2, SSE3, AMD64, Cool'n'Quiet, NX Bit, AMD-V
 Socket AM2, HyperTransport (1000 MHz, HT1000)
 VCore: 1.25–1.35 V
 Power use (TDP):
 35 Watt (3800+ EE SFF)
 65 Watt (3600+ to 5200+ EE)
 89 Watt (3800+ to 6000+)
 125 Watt (6000+ to 6400+)
 First release: May 23, 2006
 Clock rate: 2000 MHz–3200 MHz
 256 KB L2 cache:
 3600+: 2000 MHz
 512 KB L2 cache: (often mislabeled as Brisbane core)
 3800+: 2000 MHz
 4200+: 2200 MHz
 4600+: 2400 MHz (F2&F3)
 5000+: 2600 MHz (F2&F3)
 5400+: 2800 MHz (F3)
 1024 KB L2 cache:
 4000+: 2000 MHz
 4400+: 2200 MHz
 4800+: 2400 MHz
 5200+: 2600 MHz (F2&F3)
 5600+: 2800 MHz (F3)
 6000+: 3000 MHz (F3)
 6400+: 3200 MHz (F3)

Brisbane (65 nm SOI)

 Silicon on insulator (SOI)
 CPU stepping: G1, G2
 L1 cache: 64 + 64 KB (data + instructions), per core
 L2 cache: 512 KB full speed, per core
 MMX, Extended 3DNow!, SSE, SSE2, SSE3, AMD64, Cool'n'Quiet, NX Bit, AMD-V
 Socket AM2, HyperTransport (1000 MHz, HT1000)
 VCore: 1.25–1.35 V
 Die size: 126 mm²
 Power use (TDP): 65 or 89 Watt
 First release: Dec 5, 2006
 Clock rate: 1900 MHz–3100 MHz
 3600+: 1900 MHz (G1)
 3800+: 2000 MHz
 4000+: 2100 MHz
 4200+: 2200 MHz (G1&G2)
 4400+: 2300 MHz (G1&G2)
 4600+: 2400 MHz (G2)
 4800+: 2500 MHz (G1&G2)
 5000+: 2600 MHz (G1&G2)
 5200+: 2700 MHz (G1&G2)
 5400+: 2800 MHz (G2)
 5600+: 2900 MHz (G2)
 5800+: 3000 MHz (G2)
 6000+: 3100 MHz (G2)

Athlon X2
'64' was omitted from the name of the Brisbane 'BE' series; the 64-bit marketing campaign initiated by AMD became insignificant once essentially all consumer CPUs became 64-bit processors.

Brisbane (65 nm SOI)
 Silicon on insulator (SOI)
 CPU stepping: G2
 L1 cache: 64 + 64 KB (data + instructions), per core
 L2 cache: 512 KB full speed, per core
 MMX, Extended 3DNow!, SSE, SSE2, SSE3, AMD64, Cool'n'Quiet, NX Bit, AMD-V
 Socket AM2, HyperTransport (1000 MHz, HT1000)
 VCore: 1.15–1.20 V
 Die size: 118 mm²
 Power use (TDP): 45 Watt
 First release: October, 2007
 Clock rate: 1900 MHz–2600 MHz
 BE-2300: 1900 MHz (G2)
 BE-2350: 2100 MHz (G2)
 BE-2400: 2300 MHz (G2)
 BE-2450: 2500 MHz (G2)
 4050e: 2100 MHz (G2)
 4450e: 2300 MHz (G2)
 4850e: 2500 MHz (G2)
 5050e: 2600 MHz (G2)

Kuma (65 nm SOI)
 Chip harvests from Agena with two cores disabled
 Silicon on insulator (SOI)
 AMD K10 microarchitecture
 CPU stepping: B3
 L1 cache: 64 + 64 KB (data + instructions), per core
 L2 cache: 512 KB full speed, per core
 L3 cache: 2 MB (shared)
 MMX, SSE, SSE2, SSE3, SSE4a, Enhanced 3DNow!, NX bit, AMD64, Cool'n'Quiet, AMD-V
 Socket AM2+, HyperTransport (1800 MHz, HT3.0)
 VCore: 1.05–1.25 V
 Die size: 288 mm²
 Power use: (TDP): 95 Watt
 First release: December 15, 2008
 Clock rate: 2300–2800 MHz
 6500BE: 2300 MHz
 7450: 2400 MHz
 7550: 2500 MHz
 7750BE: 2700 MHz
 7850BE: 2800 MHz

See also
 List of AMD Athlon X2 processors
 List of AMD Athlon 64 processors
 List of AMD Athlon II processors
 List of AMD processors
 Parallel computing

References

External links
 Athlon64 X2 product site
 Comparison with the Intel Core Duo
 AMD Athlon 64 Power and Thermal Data Sheet site (PDF)

AMD x86 microprocessors